Shandong Tengding Football Club are a China League Two club. They are an association football club from Zibo. The Qi Capital Culture Sports City Stadium is their home venue.

Results

As of the end of 2014 season

All-time League rankings

:  in North League

References

Football clubs in China
Defunct football clubs in China